Richard Yee is a Filipino former professional basketball player. He last played for the Barako Bull Energy Boosters in the Philippine Basketball Association.

References 

Living people
Filipino men's basketball players
1977 births
Magnolia Hotshots players
UST Growling Tigers basketball players
People from Antique (province)
Basketball players from Antique (province)
Power forwards (basketball)
Barako Bull Energy players
Barako Bull Energy Boosters players
Centers (basketball)
Magnolia Hotshots draft picks